Ostend is a hamlet in the English county of Essex.

It is located about a mile north-west of the town of Burnham-on-Crouch where the population is included.

Hamlets in Essex
Burnham-on-Crouch